Vitaly Frilyevich Smirnov (born 25 October 1978 in Yekaterinburg) is an Uzbekistani decathlete.

He finished tenth at the 2003 World Championships in Paris, won the gold medal at the 2003 Asian Championships in Manila in a personal best score of 8021 points, finished seventeenth at the 2004 Summer Olympics in Athens and won a silver medal at the 2006 Asian Games in Doha.

He participated in the 2007 Asian Championship in Amman and the World Championship in Osaka.

He finished fourth in the heptathlon at the 2008 Asian Indoor Athletics Championships in Doha. Being among the leaders of the Uzbek national team, he successfully passed the selection for the Olympic Games in Beijing - this time he failed all attempts in the long jump and withdrew from the competition after three stages.

Competition record

References

External links

1978 births
Living people
Sportspeople from Yekaterinburg
Uzbekistani decathletes
Athletes (track and field) at the 2004 Summer Olympics
Athletes (track and field) at the 2008 Summer Olympics
Olympic athletes of Uzbekistan
Asian Games medalists in athletics (track and field)
Athletes (track and field) at the 2002 Asian Games
Athletes (track and field) at the 2006 Asian Games
Asian Games silver medalists for Uzbekistan
Medalists at the 2006 Asian Games
Uzbekistani people of Russian descent